Carnhell Green is a hamlet in west Cornwall, England, United Kingdom. It is in the civil parish of Gwinear-Gwithian.

References 

Hamlets in Cornwall